Tatsiana Likhtarovich (Таццяна Аляксандраўна Ліхтаровіч, born 29 March 1988) is a Belarusian basketball player who competed in the 2008 Summer Olympics.

References

1988 births
Living people
Basketball players at the 2008 Summer Olympics
Basketball players at the 2016 Summer Olympics
Belarusian expatriate basketball people in France
Belarusian expatriate basketball people in Hungary
Belarusian women's basketball players
Olympic basketball players of Belarus
Shooting guards
Basketball players from Minsk